The Parti Québécois Crisis of 1984 was one of the most severe internal party crises in Quebec politics.

Origins

In September 1984, Progressive Conservative politician Brian Mulroney became Prime Minister of Canada, with the backing of many Parti Québécois (PQ) supporters.  Tensions erupted between the more radical supporters of the PQ–including most of the so-called purs et durs, or hardliners–and the more moderate ones over Premier René Lévesque’s decisions to:

 shift toward a more conciliatory approach with the federal government over constitutional issues (a policy known as beau risque);
 put the promotion of sovereignty on the back burner.

In November 1984, six PQ Members of the National Assembly of Quebec (MNAs) resigned from the Cabinet.  They were soon followed by other legislators who crossed the floor to sit as Independents.

Consequences

The PQ’s majority in the National Assembly almost completely vanished.  It had started the term with 80 MNAs. By the end of the term, it was reduced to only 60 MNAs.

On June 3, 1985, the PQ lost a series of four by-elections, managing to finish third in the district of L’Assomption, behind Progressive Conservative Party of Quebec Leader André Asselin, with only 20% of the vote.

Eventually, the incident resulted in the resignation of Premier René Lévesque.  In September 1985, a party leadership election chose Pierre-Marc Johnson, another moderate, as his successor.

However, the PQ lost the 1985 election and by 1987, the party’s radical wing pressured Johnson into quitting.  Radicals were able to get Jacques Parizeau, one of their own, to take over the leadership of the party.

Defectors

Members of the Cabinet are indicated with bold fonts.

Notes

Parti Québécois
1984 in Canada
René Lévesque
1984 in Quebec